is a Japanese manga artist who has worked on several projects, including his adaptation on the popular Kingdom Hearts series.

Career

Amano worked on the manga adaptation of the Legend of Mana video game series. It was serialized from 2000 to 2002 and  published in five volumes.

Amano also worked on the Kingdom Hearts manga adaptations, following the events that took place in the video games with differences to account for the loss of interactivity a video game provides. The manga was originally serialized in Japan by Square Enix's Monthly Shōnen Gangan and eventually released in tankōbon format. The first tankōbon was released in Japan in October 2003. The manga was released in the US by Tokyopop two years later in October 2005. Yen Press now holds the rights to publish the books for the USA market. The first series, Kingdom Hearts, consists of four volumes, while the second series, Kingdom Hearts: Chain of Memories, has two volumes. The third series, Kingdom Hearts II, has had five volumes published and is currently on hiatus. A fourth series based on Kingdom Hearts 358/2 Days is being serialized. The games have also been adapted as a light novel series, written by Tomoco Kanemaki and illustrated by Shiro Amano. Like the manga series, it is divided into separate series based on the games. Kingdom Hearts is divided into two volumes; "The First Door" and "Darkness Within". Kingdom Hearts: Chain of Memories is divided into two volumes. Kingdom Hearts II is divided into four volumes; "Roxas—Seven Days", "The Destruction of Hollow Bastion", "Tears of Nobody", and "Anthem—Meet Again/Axel Last Stand".

Works

Artbook
 Amano Shiro (天野 シロ) Art Works Kingdom Hearts

References

External links
  
 

Living people
Manga artists
1976 births